Gil H. Rowntree (born January 17, 1934, in Toronto, Ontario) is a Canadian Hall of Fame Thoroughbred racehorse trainer and owner.

One of the most successful trainers in Canadian Thoroughbred racing history, Rowntree embarked on his racing career as a jockey in his native Toronto, riding from 1949 through 1951. As a trainer, he learned his conditioning skills as an assistant to Hall of Fame trainer and Kentucky Derby winner, Lou Cavalaris, Jr. Rowntree obtained his trainer's licence in 1959 and was hired by Stafford Farms in 1967  where he remained until the death of owner Jack Stafford in 1981.

During his training career, Gil Rowntree won eight Canadian Classic Races and following the creation of the Sovereign Awards program in 1975 he was voted the first-ever winner as Canada's Outstanding Trainer.

In 1973, Gil Rowntree set a record when horses he trained ran 1-2-3 in the Prince of Wales Stakes, the second leg of the Canadian Triple Crown series. Although Rowntree has won four editions of Canada's most prestigious race, the Queen's Plate, he is best known as the trainer of the 1978 Queen's Plate runner-up, Overskate. The Hall of Fame colt was twice voted Canadian Horse of the Year as part of his record setting nine Sovereign Awards while competing in Canada and at various tracks in the United States. As well, Rowntree conditioned Canadian champions Deceit Dancer, Proud Tobin, Northern Blossom, Ten Gold Pots, Allan Blue, Key to the Moon, Sound Reason and Tudor Queen, the 1969 American Champion Two-Year-Old Filly, and in the pre Sovereign Award era, the de facto Canadian Two Year-Old Champion.

Gil Rowntree makes his home near Woodbine Racetrack in Etobicoke, Ontario and continues to train Thoroughbreds for various owners plus breed, race and train horses for his own Gil Rowntree Racing Stable.

References
Gil Rowntree at the Canadian Horse Racing Hall of Fame

1934 births
Living people
Canadian horse trainers
Canadian Horse Racing Hall of Fame inductees
Sportspeople from Toronto